The 2020 United States House of Representatives elections in Kansas was held on November 3, 2020, to elect the four U.S. representatives from the state of Kansas, one from each of the state's four congressional districts. The elections coincided with the 2020 U.S. presidential election, as well as other elections to the House of Representatives, elections to the United States Senate and various state and local elections.

Overview

District 1

The 1st district takes in over half of Kansas, encompassing rural western and northern Kansas, including Manhattan, Salina, Dodge City, Emporia, Garden City, Hays and Hutchinson. The incumbent was Republican Roger Marshall, who was reelected with 68.1% of the vote in 2018. Marshall announced on September 7, 2019, that he would not be running for re-election, opting to run for the open U.S. Senate seat in Kansas instead.

Republican primary

Candidates

Nominee
Tracey Mann, former Lieutenant Governor of Kansas (2018–2019) and candidate for Kansas's 1st congressional district in 2010

Eliminated in primary
Bill Clifford, Finney County commissioner
Jerry Molstad, physician assistant and retired U.S. Army Colonel
Michael Soetaert, reverend

Withdrew
Troy Waymaster, state representative

Declined
Tim Huelskamp, former U.S. Representative for Kansas's 1st congressional district (2011–2017)
Roger Marshall, incumbent U.S. Representative (running for U.S. Senate)
Ken Rahjes, state representative (running for re-election)

Endorsements

Primary results

Democratic primary

Candidates

Nominee
Kali Barnett, author and teacher

Eliminated in primary
Christy Davis, concert director

Withdrew
Brandon Williams, local Walmart manager

Primary results

General election

Predictions

Polling

Results

District 2

The 2nd district encompasses most of eastern Kansas from Nebraska to Oklahoma save the Kansas City metropolitan area, including both the cities of Topeka and Lawrence. The incumbent is Republican Steve Watkins, who was elected with 47.6% of the vote in 2018. In August 2019, Watkins evaded questions about his political future coming from reporters who encountered him at a Fort Scott constituent meeting in Southeast Kansas where he had been talking about aiding veterans. Kansas State Treasurer Jake LaTurner had declared his intention to run for the seat of retiring U.S. Senator Pat Roberts, but was persuaded by Republican party officials to instead run against Watkins.

Republican primary

Candidates

Nominee
Jake LaTurner, Kansas State Treasurer

Eliminated in primary
Dennis Taylor, former Secretary of the Kansas Department of Administration, former deputy director of the Kansas Lottery, and candidate for Kansas Secretary of State in 2018
Steve Watkins, incumbent U.S. Representative

Endorsements

Primary results

Democratic primary

Candidates

Nominee
 Michelle De La Isla, mayor of Topeka

Eliminated in primary
 James K. Windholz, graduate teaching assistant at the University of Kansas

Withdrawn
Abbie Hodgson, former speechwriter for former Governor of Kansas Kathleen Sebelius

Endorsements

Primary results

General election

Predictions

Polling

with Steve Watkins and Michelle De La Isla

Results

District 3

The 3rd district encompasses the Kansas City metropolitan area, including Kansas City, Overland Park, Lenexa, Shawnee, Spring Hill, DeSoto and Olathe. The incumbent is Democrat Sharice Davids, who flipped the district and was elected with 53.6% of the vote in 2018, unseating four-term Republican incumbent Kevin Yoder.

Democratic primary

Candidates

Declared
Sharice Davids, incumbent U.S. Representative

Endorsements

Primary results

Republican primary

Candidates

Nominee
Amanda Adkins, Cerner Corporation executive and former Kansas Republican Party chairwoman

Eliminated in primary
Mike Beehler, construction engineering executive
Adrienne Foster, former mayor of Roeland Park and Small Business Administration official
Tom Love, former state representative
Sara Hart Weir, former CEO of the National Down Syndrome Society

Declined
Kevin Yoder, former U.S. Representative

Endorsements

Primary results

General election

Predictions

Polling

Results

District 4

The 4th district is located in south-central Kansas, taking in Wichita and the surrounding suburbs, including Derby and Newton. The incumbent is Republican Ron Estes, who won the 2017 special election for the seat vacated by Mike Pompeo and was re-elected with 59.4% of the vote in 2018.

Republican primary

Candidates

Declared
Ron Estes, incumbent U.S. Representative

Primary results

Democratic primary

Candidates

Declared
Laura Lombard, business consultant and candidate for Kansas's 4th congressional district in 2018

Primary results

General election

Predictions

Polling

Results

Notes

Partisan clients

References

External links
 
 
  (State affiliate of the U.S. League of Women Voters)
 

Official campaign websites for 1st district candidates
 Kali Barnett (D) for Congress 
 Tracey Mann (R) for Congress

Official campaign websites for 2nd district candidates
 Michelle De La Isla (D) for Congress 
 Jake LaTurner (R) for Congress

Official campaign websites for 3rd district candidates
 Amanda Adkins (R) for Congress
 Sharice Davids (D) for Congress

Official campaign websites for 4th district candidates
 Ron Estes (R) for Congress
 Laura Lombard (D) for Congress

2020
Kansas
United States House of Representatives